Armen Agop (born in 1969 in Cairo) is a contemporary Egyptian artist who is changing perspectives and pushing the boundaries on contemporary art. He is known for his spiritually charged contemplative works, which were described to reminiscence the harmony, balance and purity of the human soul.  Agop engages meditative practices in his processes, prioritizing inwardness and inner monumentality. Soberness, slowness and renouncement of demonstrative abilities, are features that characterize his ascetic approach.

Early life and education
Agop was born Armen Guerboyan to Armenian parents living in Cairo, Egypt. Growing up between these two cultures with ancient roots, drove him to develop a perspective beyond the geographical boundaries. The dialog between the two heritages created in him a continuous reevaluation of values, a personal perspective unconditioned by east and west or ancient and contemporary. Agop was also affected by the dry landscape of Egypt, saying, "It was in the desert, where there seems to be nothing, that's where I learned to see".

Agop showed an interest in drawing and painting at a very young age and by the age of 13 was a student of the Armenian painter, Simon Shahrigian. He completed the Faculty of the Fine Arts at Helwan University in Cairo. After graduating, he received an assistant researcher scholarship to teach sculpture at the same university for three years.

Career
From 1997-2000 Agop exhibited in diverse shows throughout Egypt and received the Sculpture prize of the Autumn Salon in 1998. In 2000, his national recognition was confirmed when he was awarded the Prix de Rome, the State Prize of Artistic Creativity in Egypt. After staying in Rome the first year on sponsorship, he moved to Pietrasanta, Italy where he continues to live and work today.  In 2011 he was awarded the Premio Umberto Mastroianni by the Biennale Internazionale di Scultura Della Regione Piemonte. In 2013, he was awarded the Premio Sulmona,  (Presidential Medal of the Italian Republic).

His works are in the permanent collections of: the Egyptian Modern Art Museum, Egypt, Mathaf: Arab Museum of Modern Art, Doha, Qatar, Villa Empain/Boghossian Foundation in Belgium, Aswan Open Air Museum, Aswan Egypt, Barjeel Art Foundation, UAE, City of Neckarsulm, Germany, Giardino di Piazza Stazione in Barge, Italy, and Coral Springs Museum of Art in Florida, USA.

Works 
Agop is known for an ascetic approach to his work. In his own words, "Simplicity is very complicated". Agop's work has also often been described as "Contrasting Art" where the contemporary and the ancient meet; his artistic presence springs from his cross-cultural philosophy. "The ancient and the contemporary may seem very different, but I think the essentials are the same", he said in Art Plural: Voices of Contemporary Art (2014).

Touch 
The Touch series breaks boundaries usually present in experiencing art. Agop invites the viewer to touch the sculptures and the sculptures move in response. By breaking the visual boundary he takes us beyond the traditional experience, to physical contact. This expands the viewer's experience and renders it more intimate by freeing them from the tradition of divinizing art and the usual "Don't Touch.". Agop says his work is about Freedom. The viewer is free to touch the sculptures and the sculptures are freed to move. The granite sculptures balance on mere millimeters allowing for them to defy the stillness usually present in sculptures, moving once they are touched. By uniting the tangible and untangle in the viewer's experience, the relationship with art is then reconstructed, suggesting a new social consciousness between the viewer and the work of art. 

"Armen Agop's sculptures repose in a secretly precarious stillness. These seemingly anchored forms consent to movement when pressed to it by our hands. Later, they inexorably return to their original position. As a result of their curved shapes, these black granite metronomes gradually slow and stop in a subtle dialogue between light and shade." Victor Hugo Riego

Sufic 
The term Sufic is derived from the spiritual heritage of Sufism in which the participants believe in the power of a single step to carry them beyond physical limitations.  Reflecting Agop's own meditative process, the Sufic series is characterized by a single contemplative, round form. In an ascetic approach Agop explores inwardness by renouncing all other forms for the pursuit of one. The focus then is about discovering the internal world and unique personality of each sculpture. The sculptures share a common material, color, and shape, yet radiate their own internal energy and personal state of being, whirling in their own orbits representing invisible parts of human consciousness. reflecting Agop's own meditative process   

"Each work may be considered as a contemporary microcosm, unnamed, self-referential, but rich of past and present identity, still tied to previous work but announcing the forthcoming one, which enables the viewer to participate in the discovery of his inner energy, sharing in the identity." Maurizio Vanni

Transcontemporary 
In 2015, Agop coined the term "Transcontemporary" which is a rejection of the limited concept of Contemporary Art. Contemporary is an ever-changing term, as what is now considered ancient was once contemporary. So, Agop mixes the 'ancient' with the 'contemporary' without obvious references to any time period, creating ultimate works that reject categorization. By widening the time horizon, Agop believes that art can be relevant regardless of geopolitics, fashion or temporary mood. He believes that artworks derived from authentic human instinct are charged with experiences that are not limited to time or geographical boundaries. Therefore an artwork can touch the human aspect in us beyond its temporary condition. An authentic sculpture can cohabit equally in an ancient tomb and in a spacecraft without losing its radiating power. Agop's work continues to make profound statements that engage the viewer to explore the future, but keep a constant remembrance of the ancient times. 

"Agop's objects seem to "materialize" and to confer a "worldly appearance" to the artist's spiritual concerns. He interferes in the nature of materials. He makes them to adopt outlandish shapes. The piece of stone is no longer speaking as its natural being but as the artist's bare self. Minimalism was the nakedness of forms; Agop's sculptures are about the nakedness of the human condition.

"These sculptures are not altars but mirrors of the viewer's soul." Rubén de la Nuez

MANTRA 
In the MANTRA series, Agop originates a gestural mantra. Instead of the transcendental vocal ritual Agop practices a physical one. With this gestural Mantra, he repurposes the repetitions into a meditative process of mark-making. Agop's innovative process involves renouncing his ability to paint or draw in favor of his belief in the strength of a single, sober point. Using the smallest possible pen nib (0.1mm), he applies colorful points on a black canvas repeating the gesture endlessly. The paintings become a materialization of time through the rituality of the gestural mantra, while invoking an optimistic source of light out of darkness.

"Armen Agop unites sculpture and painting in a meditation on the power of darkness to generate light. The complete synergy of body, mind and spirit lies at the core of Agop's practice, for whom art is a spiritual form of asceticism." Claudio Scorretti

Awards
2000/2001 – Prix de Rome
2010 – International Umberto Mastroianni award
2013 – Premio Sulmona, Rassegna Internazionale D'Arte Contemporanea/Presidential Medal of the Italian Republic

Collections 

 Aswan Open Air Museum, Egypt
 Bozzetti Museum Pietrasanta, Italy
 Coral Springs Museum of Art, Florida, USA
 Egyptian Modern Art Museum, Egypt
 Mathaf: Arab Museum of Modern Art, Qatar
 Villa Empain/Boghossian Foundation, Belgium
 Barjeel Art Foundation, Sharjah

External links 

 Official website

References 

Living people
1969 births
Artists from Cairo
Egyptian people of Armenian descent
Armenian sculptors
20th-century Egyptian sculptors
21st-century Egyptian sculptors
21st-century sculptors
Egyptian contemporary artists
Contemporary sculptors
Contemporary artists
Egyptian sculptors